A public policy school is typically a university program that teaches students policy analysis, program evaluation, policy studies, public policy, political economy, urban planning, public administration, international relations, security studies, political science, urban studies, intelligence studies, global studies, emergency management, public affairs and/or public management. Public policy schools typically train students in two streams. The more practical stream treats the master's degree as a terminal degree, which trains students to work as policy analysts or practitioners in governments, government relations, think tanks, and consulting firms. A more theoretical stream aims to train students who are aiming to go on to complete doctoral studies (e.g., a PhD), with the goal of becoming professors of public policy, political science in general, or researchers.

Public policy schools offer a wide range of public policy degrees. At the undergraduate level, universities, especially research-intensive universities may offer a Bachelor of Arts or Bachelor of Science degree with majors or concentrations in public policy, public administration, political science, policy studies or any other differently named but content-wise identical major or concentration. These undergraduate degrees are typically offered by a university's public administration or political science faculties whether it be part of a public policy school or a college of arts and sciences. Well known Master's degrees within this academic field include the Master of Public Policy (MPP), the Master of Public Administration (MPA), the Master of Public Affairs (MPAff), the Master of Public Service (MPS), the Master of Urban Planning (MUP) , the Master of International Affairs (MIA), and Master of Arts or Master of Sciences in International Relations, Political Science, or International Security, or other sub-fields of political science.  Schools with an international and interdisciplinary focus may award a Master of Arts degree in International Policy Studies. Some schools also offer Executive Master's Degrees in the same topics for mid-career individuals and a Master of Professional Studies degree to signify that the education takes an applied rather than theoretical approach. Doctoral degrees include PhDs in public policy, policy studies and public administration, as well as the Doctor of Public Administration (DPA). Some schools offer relatively short-duration certificate programs aimed at working policy analysts, government managers and public executives.

In North America, students typically pursue a graduate public policy degree after having completed an undergraduate degree, either in a public administration or political science field. Some programs admit students with any undergraduate degree; however, students without a background in public administration or political science may be required to do qualifying courses in these areas. Some universities allow students to complete both degrees concurrently. North American public policy programs are generally located in an autonomous graduate or professional school within a larger university, while at others combine both graduate and undergraduate programs into a single semi-autonomous constituent college.

Curriculum
Most public policy and administration programs combine elements of political science, economics, statistics, law mostly in the form of public law, administrative law, and Legal management (academic discipline), international relations (including international law), international development, public finance, leadership studies, ethics, sociology, comparative research, global studies, urban planning, urban studies public policy, public administration, policy analysis, and program evaluation. More recently, public policy schools have applied quantitative analysis, management information systems, data science and analytics, organizational behavior, organization development, knowledge management, project management, political communication, political psychology, criminology and the sociology of law, philosophy (in particular political philosophy), peace and conflict studies, geography and geographic information science, intelligence studies, emergency management, cross-cultural studies, public health, environmental science and environmental studies, business administration, civil engineering, industrial engineering, systems engineering, human resource management, and operations research as part of their public policy and administration education programs to tackle issue in the public sector, the non-profit sector, or the government relations and regulatory affairs industry in the private sector. 

While degrees in Public Policy and Public Administration at most universities are generally taught at the graduate level (master's and PhD), some undergraduate degree program majors, concentrations, and minors either as standalone degrees or as concentrations within a degree in political science or international relations still exist, especially at research universities where research, graduate, and undergraduate faculty overlap and/or have close cooperation unlike liberal arts colleges (particularly liberal arts colleges in the United States) that focus on the more theoretical and philosophical sides of political science rather than the applied and administrative side of political science.

Admission
Undergraduate level admissions are comparable to other undergraduate programs, but this may vary between educational institutions due to conflict between the demand for admission and supply of seats.

On the graduate-level, in contrast to many other graduate-level programs, applicants with various, sometimes unrelated, educational backgrounds can be admitted to public policy schools. Applicants' backgrounds can range from programs which have a significant content overlap, such as public administration, economics and political science, to undergraduate majors that are related, such as the social sciences, to undergraduate programs which may have little content overlap (e.g., physical sciences and engineering). Students without an undergraduate major in a related field may be required to complete qualifying undergraduate courses in public policy. Admissions requirements, including standardized testing requirements, vary widely. Some schools have a second language requirement due to their global orientation. In the United States, applicants for post-graduate programs must have graduated with a bachelor's degree from an accredited university and are generally required to take the Graduate Record Examination (GRE). Many schools also accept the Law School Admission Test (LSAT) or the Graduate Management Admission Test (GMAT) in lieu of the GRE.

Notable institutions

North America 

Canada
 Balsillie School of International Affairs, a joint initiative between CIGI, University of Waterloo, and Wilfrid Laurier University, Waterloo, Ontario
 Master of Public Service at University of Waterloo, Waterloo, Ontario
 Munk School of Global Affairs and Public Policy at the University of Toronto, Toronto, Ontario
 Norman Paterson School of International Affairs at Carleton University, Ottawa, Ontario
 University of Ottawa's Graduate School of Public and International Affairs, Ottawa, Ontario
 The School of Public Policy and Global Affairs at University of British Columbia, Vancouver, British Columbia
 The Max Bell School of Public Policy at McGill University, Montréal, Quebec
 The School of Policy Studies at Queen's University, Kingston, Ontario
 The School of Public Policy at the University of Calgary, Calgary, Alberta
 School of Public Administration at Dalhousie University, Halifax, Nova Scotia
 Master in Public Policy and Public Administration (MPPPA), Department of Political Science at Concordia University, Montréal, Quebec
 Department of Political Science at the Université de Montréal, Montréal, Quebec
 Master of Public Affairs, Department of Political Science at Université Laval, Québec City, Quebec
 Ecole nationale d'administration publique at the Université du Québec, Québec City, Quebec
 Johnson-Shoyama Graduate School of Public Policy at the University of Saskatchewan and the University of Regina, Regina, Saskatchewan
 The Glendon School of Public and International Affairs at York University, Toronto, Ontario
 Department of Politics and Public Administration at Toronto Metropolitan University, Toronto, Ontario
 The School of Public Policy at Simon Fraser University, Vancouver, British Columbia
 The School of Public Administration at the University of Victoria, Victoria, British Columbia

United States
Public policy schools in the United States tackle policy analysis differently. The Harris School of Public Policy Studies at the University of Chicago has a more quantitative and economics approach to policy, the Heinz College at Carnegie Mellon uses computational and technology-driven methods, while the John F. Kennedy School of Government at Harvard University has a more political science and leadership based approach. The Indiana University School of Public and Environmental Affairs provides traditional public policy training with multidisciplinary concentrations available in the environmental sciences and nonprofit management. Moreover, the University of Illinois at Chicago offers public policy training that emphasizes the stages of decision-making in formulating policy (e.g. agenda setting), as well as the importance of framing effects and cognitive limits in policy formation.

Schools of public policy that have met professional standards of education and quality in the United States are accredited by the Network of Schools of Public Policy, Affairs, and Administration (NASPAA):
 Johns Hopkins Institute for Policy Studies and Graduate Program in Public Management at Johns Hopkins University
 Princeton School of Public and International Affairs at Princeton University
 McCourt School of Public Policy at Georgetown University
 Ford Dorsey Master's in International Policy at Stanford University
 John F. Kennedy School of Government at Harvard University
 School of International and Public Affairs at Columbia University
 School of International Service and School of Public Affairs at American University
 Institute for Public Affairs at Cornell University
 Harris School of Public Policy Studies at the University of Chicago
 Goldman School of Public Policy at the University of California, Berkeley
 Luskin School of Public Affairs at the University of California, Los Angeles
 Robert F. Wagner Graduate School of Public Service at New York University
 Robert M. La Follette School of Public Affairs at the University of Wisconsin–Madison
 Gerald R. Ford School of Public Policy at the University of Michigan
 Harry S Truman School of Public Affairs at the University of Missouri
 Daniel J. Evans School of Public Affairs at the University of Washington
 Edward J. Bloustein School of Planning and Public Policy at Rutgers University
 UCR School of Public Policy at the University of California, Riverside
 Center for Public Administration and Policy at Virginia Tech
 Andrew Young School of Policy Studies at Georgia State University
 Fels Institute of Government at the University of Pennsylvania
 Frank Batten School of Leadership and Public Policy at the University of Virginia
 Schar School of Policy and Government at George Mason University
 H. John Heinz III College of Information Systems and Public Policy at Carnegie Mellon University
 Hubert H. Humphrey School of Public Affairs at the University of Minnesota
 Ivan Allen College of Liberal Arts at the Georgia Institute of Technology
 O'Neill School of Public and Environmental Affairs at Indiana University Bloomington
 John Glenn School of Public Affairs at Ohio State University
Arkansas State University College of Liberal Arts and Communication
Frederick S. Pardee RAND Graduate School at the RAND Corporation
 Lyndon B. Johnson School of Public Affairs at the University of Texas at Austin
 Martin School of Public Policy and Administration at the University of Kentucky
 Master of Public Administration Program (UMPA) at the University of Miami
 Marxe School of Public and International Affairs at Baruch College
 Maxine Goodman Levin College of Urban Affairs at Cleveland State University
 Maxwell School of Citizenship and Public Affairs at Syracuse University
 Mills College, Lokey School of Business and Public Policy at Mills College
 Monterey Institute of International Studies at Middlebury College
 Rockefeller College of Public Affairs and Policy at the University at Albany, SUNY
 Sanford School of Public Policy at Duke University
 School of Public Policy at the University of Massachusetts Amherst
 Helms School of Government at Liberty University
 Sol Price School of Public Policy at the University of Southern California
 School of Public Policy at Oregon State University
 The Bush School of Government and Public Service at Texas A&M University
 Trachtenberg School of Public Policy and Public Administration at The George Washington University
 Clinton School of Public Service at the University of Arkansas
 School of Public and International Affairs at the University of Georgia
 Department of Public Policy at the University of Maryland, Baltimore County
 School of Public Policy at the University of Maryland, College Park
 School of Public Policy at Pepperdine University
 University of Pittsburgh Graduate School of Public and International Affairs
School of Public Policy and Urban Affairs at Northeastern University

Mexico
 Public Administration Division at Centro de Investigación y Docencia Económicas, Mexico City
 Instituto Tecnológico Autónomo de México, Mexico City
 Center for International Studies at El Colegio de México, Mexico City
 Universidad Nacional Autónoma de México, Mexico City
 National Institute of Public Administration, Mexico City
 School of Government and Public Transformation at the Instituto Tecnológico y de Estudios Superiores de Monterrey, campus Monterrey and Mexico City
 Department of Social Sciences and Politics at Universidad Iberoamericana, Mexico City
 Universidad Autónoma de la Ciudad de México, UACM, Colegio de de Ciencias Sociales y Humanidades (Ciencias Política y Administración Urbana).
 Universidad Autónoma de Sinaloa, UAS, Facultad de Estudios Internacionales y Políticas Públicas

South America 

Brazil
 FGV-EAESP, São Paulo
 FGV-EBAPE, Rio de Janeiro
 Professor Paulo Neves de Carvalho Government School, Belo Horizonte

Europe 
In Europe, the LUISS School of Government offers a multidisciplinary approach to public policy combining economics, political science, new public management, and policy analysis, while the French institute of political studies Sciences Po complements these core disciplines with organizational sociology, human security, political economy, and leadership.

The European Commission through its Erasmus Mundus Programme has funded the Erasmus Mundus Master Program in Public Policy since 2007. This program brings together four leading policy-oriented schools in Eurorpe: The IBEI (Spain), Central European University (Hungary), the International Institute of Social Studies of the Erasmus University Rotterdam (The Netherlands) and the Department of Politics at the University of York (United Kingdom).

Europe-wide
 Erasmus Mundus Master Program in Public Policy

Czech Republic
 Department of Public and Social Policy at Charles University in Prague

France
Institut d'études politiques de Paris or Sciences Po Paris
Institut d'études politiques de Strasbourg at Université de Strasbourg
Institut d'études politiques de Bordeaux 
Institut d'études politiques de Toulouse
Institut d'études politiques de Grenoble
Institut d'études politiques de Lyon
Institut d'études politiques d'Aix-en-Provence
Institut d'études politiques de Lille
Institut d'études politiques de Rennes
Institut d'études politiques de Saint-Germain-en-Laye

Germany
 Hertie School of Governance, Berlin
 Department of Politics and Administration at University of Konstanz
 Department of Political and Social Science at Freie Universität Berlin
 Willy Brandt School of Public, Erfurt
 German University of Administrative Sciences, Speyer
 NRW School of Governance, Duisburg
 Bavarian School of Public Policy, Munich
 Department of Politics, Administration & International Relations, Zeppelin University

Hungary
 School of Public Policy at the Central European University, Budapest
 Corvinus University of Budapest (Department of Public Policy and Management-EAPAA accredited)

Italy;
 Luiss School of Government at Libera Università Internazionale degli Studi Sociali Guido Carli, Rome

Kazakhstan
  Graduate School of Public Policy, at Nazarbayev University, Nur-Sultan

Netherlands
 The Maastricht Graduate School of Governance at Maastricht University and the United Nations University
 The International Institute of Social Studies at the Erasmus University Rotterdam

United Kingdom
 Blavatnik School of Government and Department of Social Policy and Intervention, University of Oxford
 Department of Politics and International Studies at the University of Cambridge
 Department of Politics and International Studies at the University of Warwick
 Institute of Public Affairs at The London School of Economics and Political Science
 School of Public Policy at the University College London
 Faculty of Social Science & Public Policy at King's College London, University of London
 School for Policy Studies at the University of Bristol
School of Government and International Affairs at Durham University
 University of Edinburgh Academy of Government at the University of Edinburgh
 The Centre for Financial and Management Studies, SOAS, University of London
 School of Government and Public Policy at the University of Strathclyde
 Department of Politics at the University of York

Russia
 The Russian Presidential Academy of National Economy and Public Administration under the President of the Russian Federation

Spain
 The IE School of Global and Public Affairs at IE University

Asia 
Indonesia
 School of Government and Public Policy (SGPP) Indonesia

Brunei Darussalam
 Institute of Policy Studies at University of Brunei Darussalam

China
 School of Government at Peking University
 School of Public Policy and Management at Tsinghua University

India

 The Ashank Desai Centre for Policy Studies at IIT Bombay was set up in 2016 to make valuable contributions to Policy Studies in India. The first batch of doctoral students joined the Centre in 2017 (Autumn), and the Centre started its Master's programme in Public Policy (MPP) in 2019 (Autumn). IIT Bombay, with its core strength in traditional science and engineering disciplines, a fully integrated Humanities and Social Science Department, a Business School (SJMSOM), the IDC School of Design, and the Centre for Technology Alternatives for Rural Areas (CTARA), has all that is required to cater to interdisciplinary research in the field of Public Policy at its Centre for Policy Studies. The broad research areas at the centre are:
 Digital Societies
 Structural Inequalities
 Technology and Society
 Markets and Governance Processes
 Environment, Energy and Natural Resources
 Tata Institute of Social Sciences, Hyderabad launched a Masters in Public Policy and Governance in Hyderabad Campus. 
 National Law School of India University, Bangalore launched an MPP programme in 2014 with some of the top faculty of India, with a special focus on law as an interface between development and public policy. 
 The postgraduate programme in Public Policy and Management course offered by Indian Institutes of Management is a multidisciplinary course with special emphasis on select policy areas such as health policy and environment policy, and has developed an economic and quantitative approach.
 Indian School of Public Policy’s one-year programme in Public Policy, Design & Management, prepares policy leaders and policy professionals with skills, wisdom and ethics to imagine, design and implement relevant solutions to India's policy and governance challenges. Founded on the commitment to world-class faculty, extensive industry linkages and innovative approach towards design and management of policy, ISPP aims to transform the art of policymaking. Designed to be asset light and talent heavy, ISPP focuses on bringing together the best minds in public policy to create a unique high quality programme that aims to create the next generation of policy leaders. The ISPP scholars not only undergo a comprehensive academic programme in Public Policy, but are also rigorously trained in management, communication and leadership skills. The one year academic session is divided into 8 terms of 6 weeks each.
 The Indian School of Business, Hyderabad & Mohali has launched an executive master's level Management Programme in Public Policy (MPPP) in consultation with one of the world's leading public policy schools, The Fletcher School of Law and Diplomacy, Tufts University. 
 Institute of Rural Manangement Anand has a center dedicated to public policy and governance. It offers courses like Public Policy and Decentralization, Public Policy Analysis, and Public Systems Management. The institute is actively involved in development consulting. 
 School of International Relations and Politics, Mahatma Gandhi University was the first to start a Master's in Public Policy and Governance which is interdisciplinary in nature.
 The Jindal School of Government and Public Policy in India offers interdisciplinary training in public policy with a focus on the policy making processes in developing and BRIC countries. The Takshashila Institution in India offers a semester-long graduate certificate in public policy instead focusing on developing public policy as an academic discipline in India as well as making public policy education accessible to working professionals. 
 Management Development Institute (MDI), Gurugram offers Public Policy Program for civil servants and doctoral programme in Public Policy and Governance. FMS-WISDOM, Banasthali Vidyapith offers MBA with minor specialisation in Public Policy and CSR, MA in Political Science and Public Administration
 Kautilya School of Public policy offers a 2-year, full-time residential Master's in Public Policy (MPP). The school offers five areas of specializations ranging from Government and Finance and Social Impact to International Affairs, Economic Development, and Justice and Fundamental Rights. The school aims to rebalance the role of Society, Government, and Business towards Equity and Regenerative Outcomes. The aim of the program is to impart an experience that is both varied and deep, the course brings together students from diverse disciplines and allows time to internalize and apply key concepts. Kautilya works with a simple philosophy-if policymaking takes place across diverse realms, why shouldn't policy students come from diverse disciplines? 

Public Policy schools in India include:
 Ashank Desai Centre for Policy Studies, IIT Bombay
 Indian School of Public Policy (ISPP), New Delhi ISPP | India's Leading Public Policy Institution
 Indian School of Business, Hyderabad
 School of Policy & Governance, Azim Premji University, Bangalore
 Indian Institute of Public Administration, New Delhi
 Indian Institute of Management Ahmedabad
 Indian Institute of Management Bangalore
 Indian Institute of Management Calcutta
 School of Public Policy and Governance, MDI Gurgaon
 Institute of Rural Management Anand
 National Law School of India University, Bangalore
 Kautilya School of Public Policy, Hyderabad
 School of Public Policy and Governance Tata Institute of Social Sciences, Hyderabad
 Jindal School of Government and Public Policy, Sonipat, Haryana
 School of Government and Public Affairs, Xavier University, Bhubaneswar
 St. Xavier's College, Mumbai
 TERI University, New Delhi
 The Takshashila Institution, an independent think tank and school of public policy
 Faculty of planning, CEPT University, Ahmedabad
 Central University of Rajasthan, Department of Public Policy, Law and Governance
 Central University of Jammu, Department of Public Policy and Public Administration
 Sri Sri University, Department of Good Governance and Public Policy, Cuttack, Odisha
 University of pertrolum and Energy studies Dehradun 
FMS-WISDOM, Banasthali Vidyapith, Rajasthan

Hong Kong

 Department of Politics and Public Administration, Faculty of Social Science, The University of Hong Kong, Hong Kong

Israel

 Federmann School of Public Policy and Government, Hebrew University of Jerusalem

Japan

 National Graduate Institute for Policy Studies, Tokyo
 Graduate School of Public Policy, University of Tokyo, Tokyo
 School of International and Public Policy, Hitotsubashi University, Tokyo
 Graduate School of Media and Governance, Keio University, Tokyo
 Graduate School of Public Management, Waseda University, Tokyo
 Graduate School of Public Policy, Chuo University, Tokyo
 Graduate School of Public Policy and Social Governance, Hosei University, Tokyo
 Graduate School of Governance Studies, Meiji University, Tokyo
 School of Government, Kyoto University, Kyoto
 Graduate School of Public Policy, Kyoto Prefectural University, Kyoto
 Graduate School of Policy and Management, Doshisha University, Kyoto
 Graduate School of Policy Science, Ritsumeikan University, Kyoto
 The Osaka School of International Public Policy, Osaka University, Osaka
 Graduate School of Governance, Kansai University, Osaka
 School and Graduate School of Public Studies, Kwansei Gakuin University, Hyōgo Prefecture
 Hokkaido University Public Policy School, Sapporo
 School of Public Policy, Tohoku University, Sendai
 Graduate School of Policy Studies, Chiba University of Commerce, Chiba
 Graduate School of Policy Studies, Iwate Prefectural University, Iwate

Nepal
 Central Department of Public Administration (CDPA)
 Public Administration Campus (PAC)
 Mahendra Morang Multiple Campus (MMC)

Philippines
 Ateneo School of Government at the Ateneo de Manila University
 National College of Public Administration and Governance at University of the Philippines Diliman
 College of Economics, Finance, and Politics at Polytechnic University of the Philippines

Qatar
 Department of Public Policy in Islam at Qatar Faculty of Islamic Studies, Hamad Bin Khalifa University

Singapore
 Lee Kuan Yew School of Public Policy at the National University of Singapore
S. Rajaratnam School of International Studies at Nanyang Technological University

South Korea
 KDI School of Public Policy and Management

Thailand
 The School of Public Policy at Chiang Mai University

United Arab Emirates
 Dubai School of Government, Dubai

Africa 

Egypt
 School of Global Affairs & Public Policy at the American University in Cairo
South Africa
 The School of Government at the University of the Western Cape

Oceania 

Australia

 Crawford School of Public Policy, Australian National University
 University of Queensland
 Australia and New Zealand School of Government
 University of Tasmania
 Sir Walter Murdoch School of Public Policy and International Affairs, Murdoch University

See also
 List of public administration schools
 List of schools of international relations

References 

 
Public policy research
Types of university or college
Schools of international relations